Black Rock is an unincorporated community and near-ghost town in the Beaver Bottoms in southern Millard County, Utah, United States, approximately  north of Milford.

Description

The town was a station stop on the Los Angeles and Salt Lake Railroad (later Union Pacific Railroad), and was a community center for the few settlers in the area during the late nineteenth century. As area roads and vehicular travel improved beginning in the twentieth century, its relative importance waned. A post office operated at Black Rock from 1891 to 1959. The site is now a ghost town although there is at least one occupied home in or near the town.

The town was named for a nearby rock formation.

See also

 List of ghost towns in Utah

References

External links

 Blackrock at GhostTowns.com

Populated places established in 1891
Ghost towns in Utah
Ghost towns in Millard County, Utah
1891 establishments in Utah Territory
Great Basin National Heritage Area
Unincorporated communities in Millard County, Utah